Goniothalamus wynaadensis is a species of plant in the Annonaceae family. It is endemic to India.

References

wynaadensis
Endemic flora of India (region)
Near threatened flora of Asia
Taxonomy articles created by Polbot